Martignano (Griko: , translit. ) is a small town and comune of 1,770 inhabitants in the province of Lecce in Apulia, Italy. It is part of Salento and is one of the nine towns of Grecìa Salentina, an area where the Greek dialect Griko is spoken.

Famous people
Marquess Giuseppe Palmieri (Martignano, 1721 – Naples, 1793) was one of the most important figures of the Enlightenment in Southern Italy.

Twinnings
 Kafar Matta, Lebanon

Honorary citizens
Sergio Vuskovic

References

Grecìa Salentina
Localities of Salento